LunEur (complete name Luna Park Permanente di Roma) is the largest amusement park in Rome and the oldest (still operating) in Italy, dating back to 1953. It took its name from the Eur district in Rome where it is located. The park closed in 2008, a decision made by the prefetto in order to guarantee the safety of the area but it reopened in 2016. It closed during the COVID-19 pandemic.

LunEur is the second Luna Park for the city, succeeding the Frederick Ingersoll-built park that closed in the 1930s.

History 

Initially, the rides were set up for the Agricultural Fair of 1953. Due to its unexpected popularity, however, a decision was made to keep the park open for a period of time every year. In 1960, the 17th Olympic Games were held in Rome, which prompted the decision to extend the park's season so it was open year-round. Five years later, a referendum was held, which led to the amusement park receiving its current name. LunEur stayed open year-round from 1960 to 1965.

Although the park maintained its popularity in the years immediately after the Olympics, it went through lean times in the early to mid 2000s.

In April 2008, one year after the renovations, the entire area was closed off.

On October 10, 2008, Mauro Miccio, managing director of Eur spa, which owns the grounds the park is located on, announced that this park might reopen at the beginning of 2009.  But nothing came of this.

8 years after its closure, LunEur opened again on October 27, 2016. Most of the original rides were dismantled and substituted with new attractions.

Rides 
Space Container, Jungle River, Pasaje del Terror, Tappeto Elastico, American Circus, Labirinto di Cristallo, Dinosauri, Ruota Panoramica, Gincana, Palla Matta, Seggiolini volanti, Venturer, Nave Pirata, Kosmodromo, Giostre, Rettilario, Nessie, Lideur Boats, Trenino el Paso, Super Truck, Rotoshake, Magica casa, Las Vegas, Crazy Dance, Simulation Theatre, Casa Svizzera, Gonfiabili, Tokaido, Jumbo, Horror House, Tagadà, Tea Cup, Flipper, Miniscooter, and Splash Bowl.

Roller Coasters
All of LunEur's roller coasters have been steel-framed, sit-down roller coasters.

Access 
The nearest metro stations are EUR Magliana, EUR Palasport and EUR Fermi of Line B. Busses 767, 706, 707, 717, 765 and 771 also go the park.

References

External links 

LunEur website (defunct)
LunEur’s page on the EUR SpA website 

1953 establishments in Italy
2008 disestablishments in Italy
2016 establishments in Italy
Tourist attractions in Rome
Buildings and structures in Rome
Amusement parks in Italy
Amusement parks opened in 1953
Amusement parks closed in 2008